Ixalodectes is a genus of Australian bush crickets.

Species
The Orthoptera Species File lists:
 Ixalodectes flectocercus Rentz, 1985
 Ixalodectes megacercus Rentz, 1985
 Ixalodectes nigrifrons Rentz, 1985
 Ixalodectes uptoni Rentz, 1985
 Ixalodectes whitei Rentz, 1985

References 

Tettigoniidae genera
Taxonomy articles created by Polbot